Domžale Sports Park or Domžale Stadium is a multi-purpose stadium located in Domžale, Slovenia. It is currently used mostly for football matches and is the home ground of NK Domžale. The stadium, which was built in 1948, currently holds 3,100 spectators. It was renovated and modernized in 1997 and 1999. Work on the new West Stand started in October 2003 and was finished in April 2004. In June 2006, the stadium received floodlights, mounted on four concrete towers and placed at each corner of the stadium.

National team matches

See also
 List of football stadiums in Slovenia

References

External links
 PrvaLiga profile

Football venues in Slovenia
Multi-purpose stadiums in Slovenia
Sports venues completed in 1948
Stadium